First Lady of Guyana is the title held by the wife of the president of Guyana. The current first lady of Guyana is Arya Ali, wife of President Irfaan Ali, who has served in the position since August 2020.

First ladies and gentlemen of Guyana

♦ Viola Burnham later served as Vice President of Guyana and deputy prime minister from 1985 to 1991.

See also
Presidents of Guyana

References

First ladies of Guyana
Presidents of Guyana
Lists of Guyanese people
Guyana
Guyana politics-related lists